Mauro Sérgio Martins Viana (born 22 May 1984), known as Mauro Viana, is a Brazilian footballer who plays for Uberlândia as a defender.

Career statistics

References

External links

1984 births
Living people
Brazilian footballers
Association football defenders
Campeonato Brasileiro Série B players
Campeonato Brasileiro Série C players
Campeonato Brasileiro Série D players
Associação Desportiva São Caetano players
Mogi Mirim Esporte Clube players
Oeste Futebol Clube players